Benton Township is one of eleven townships in Monroe County, Indiana, United States. As of the 2010 census, its population was 3,358 and it contained 1,716 housing units.

History
Benton Township was established in 1833. It was named for Thomas Hart Benton, a U.S. Senator from Missouri. Benton township was divided into Marion township to the north and Benton township to the south in August 1845. The current township was formed in January 1916 when Marion township and Benton township merged back together to form a single township.

Honey Creek School was listed on the National Register of Historic Places in 1978.

Geography

Unincorporated towns
 Fleener at 
 New Unionville at 
 Unionville at

Cemeteries
The township trustee maintains four cemeteries: Fleener/Richardson, Stepp, Brock, and Taylor/McGowan/Frye.

Major highways
  Indiana State Road 46

Lakes
 Beanblossom Lake
 Cherry Lake
 Lazy Lake

School districts
 Monroe County Community School Corporation

Political districts
 Indiana's 9th congressional district
 State House District 60
 State Senate District 40

References
 
 United States Census Bureau 2008 TIGER/Line Shapefiles
 IndianaMap

External links
 Indiana Township Association
 United Township Association of Indiana
 City-Data.com page for Benton Township

Townships in Monroe County, Indiana
Bloomington metropolitan area, Indiana
Townships in Indiana